Kristupas Šleiva is a Lithuanian Greco-Roman wrestler. He is a bronze medalist at both the World Wrestling Championships and the European Wrestling Championships.

Career 

In 2019, he competed in the 67 kg event at the European Wrestling Championships held in Bucharest, Romania.

In 2020, he won one of the bronze medals in the 67 kg event at the European Wrestling Championships held in Rome, Italy.

Major results

References

External links 

 

Living people
Year of birth missing (living people)
Place of birth missing (living people)
Lithuanian male sport wrestlers
European Wrestling Championships medalists
World Wrestling Championships medalists
21st-century Lithuanian people